"Kiss You All Over" is a 1978 song performed by American group Exile, written by Mike Chapman and Nicky Chinn. It was included on the band's third album, Mixed Emotions (1978), and featured lead vocalist Jimmy Stokley and guitarist J.P. Pennington on vocals. On the American Top 40 broadcast of May 26, 1979, Casey Kasem reported that Chapman stated his source of inspiration for "Kiss You All Over" was "It's Ecstasy When You Lay Down Next to Me" by Barry White. The song was a number one single in the United States, but proved to be Exile's only big hit in the pop market (they would later have great success on the country music charts).  

It held the number one spot on the Billboard Hot 100 for four weeks (starting September 30), and Billboard ranked it as the No. 5 song for 1978.  The track also reached number-one in at least three other nations. In the United Kingdom, the song was released on Mickie Most's RAK Records, and peaked at number 6 on the UK Singles Chart. The strings are played with a synthesizer in a backing track.  In 2010, Billboard ranked the song tenth on its list of "The 50 Sexiest Songs of All Time".

Lead vocalist on the number, Stokley was ousted from the band in 1979, his health declining thereafter until he died at the age of 41 in 1985. After the success of soft rock singles from the albums Mixed Emotions and All There Is, the band moved into country music in the 1980s.

Charts

Weekly charts

Year-end charts

All-time charts

Broadway version

Disco band Broadway recorded their version. The single backed with "Love Bandit" was released on Hilltak 7802, and distributed by Atlantic Records. It was also issued in a 12" format. Music magazine called it "The inevitable disco version". 

It had a three week run with the song on the Billboard Hot Soul Singles chart, peaking at #92 on December 16, 1978.

Chart

No Mercy version

German Eurodance trio No Mercy's 1997 remixed version by Johnny Vicious and Darrin "Spike" Friedman reached number-one on the Billboard Hot Dance Club Play chart. It also reached number 16 on the UK Singles Chart and number 47 in Australia.

Critical reception
Larry Flick from Billboard wrote that "there's no denying that No Mercy's eponymous album is several notches above standard dance/pop fare—as evidenced by this Latin-spiced rendition of Exile's '70s-era hit." He noted that "the song's hook thrives within FMP's arrangement of swirling house beats and flamenco guitars." He also added "factor in the act's sweet harmonies". The magazine's Paul Verna viewed it as an "giddy rendition". Diana Valois from The Morning Call picked "Kiss You All Over" as the "second best cut" of the album, describing it as "a full-blown flamenco exotica cover". Pan-European magazine Music & Media constated that "this highly successful trio has given this song a poppy-flamenco treatment that is likely to mean it will chart all over the place once again, something that proves that good songs last a long while." A reviewer from Music Week rated the song four out of five, concluding, "A third huge hit for the boys."

Tracklisting
 CD single
 "Kiss You All Over" (Radio Edit) - 4:31
 "Kiss You All Over" (Club Mix) - 5:53
 "Bonita" (Radio Edit) - 3:54
 "Bonita" (Club Mix) - 7:08

Charts

Release history

References

1978 songs
1978 singles
1997 singles
1998 singles
Billboard Hot 100 number-one singles
Cashbox number-one singles
Exile (American band) songs
Number-one singles in New Zealand
Number-one singles in South Africa
Number-one singles in Australia
Songs written by Mike Chapman
Song recordings produced by Frank Farian
Song recordings produced by Mike Chapman
Songs written by Nicky Chinn
RAK Records singles
Curb Records singles
Hilltak Records singles
Warner Records singles
Arista Records singles
No Mercy (pop band) songs
Songs about kissing
Phyllis Hyman songs